NCAA Final Four 99 is a video game developed by Killer Game and published by 989 Sports for the PlayStation in 1999. It was the first of several college basketball games published by 989 Sports.

Game play
NCAA Final Four 99 has four game play modes: Quick Start, Exhibition, New Season, and New Tournament. The game includes all the 250 Division 1 NCAA teams  There are teams and players in 32 different categories. The game includes teams, polls, standings, and award stats, as well as an injury report. The options allow players to modify game standards, injuries, fatigue, auto replays, game speed, difficulty level, and the choice of replay color. The player can take control of all five players on the team. NCAA FINAL FOUR 99 offers three gameplay modes: Exhibition, Tournament, and a 30-game Season.

Ratings 
It has 7.9 out of 10 on IGN.

References

External links
 

1999 video games
Basketball video games
NCAA video games
North America-exclusive video games
PlayStation (console) games
PlayStation (console)-only games
Video games developed in the United States
Video games set in 1999
Video games set in the United States